Aleksa is a South Slavic masculine given name derived from Greek Alexios (Αλέξιος), meaning "Defender", usually a diminutive of Aleksandar ("Alexander").

It may refer to:
Aleksa Simić (1800–1872), Serbian politician and member of the Ustavobranioci
Aleksa Dundić (1890s-1920), Yugoslav communist and October Revolutionary
Aleksa Šantić (1868–1924), Serbian poet
Aleksa Nenadović (1749–1804), Serbian ober knyaz
Aleksa Brđović (born 1993), Serbian volleyball player
Aleksa Šaponjić (born 1992), Serbian water polo player
Aleksa Gajić (born 1974), Serbian comics artist and film director
Aleksa Matić (footballer, born 1996) (born 1996), Serbian footballer
Aleksa Radovanović (1900–2004), the last of Salonika front veteran alive and president of veteran association
Aleksa Buha (born 1939), Serbian philosopher and academic
Aleksa or Alex Bogdanovic, (born 1984), Serbian-British tennis player
Aleksa Milojević (born 2000), Serbian footballer

See also
Aleksa (surname)
Alek

Feminine given names
Masculine given names
Serbian feminine given names
Serbian masculine given names